Nyasa District is a district of the Ruvuma Region of Tanzania.

In 2016 the Tanzania National Bureau of Statistics report there were 159,103 people in the district, from 146,160 in 2012.

The district has 3 divisions, 20 wards, and 84 villages.

References 

Districts of Ruvuma Region